Miloš Žutić (16 November 1939 – 30 August 1993) was a Serbian actor. He appeared in more than one hundred films from 1960 to 1992.

Selected filmography

References

External links 

1939 births
1993 deaths
Male actors from Belgrade
Serbian male film actors
20th-century Serbian male actors